Tea Banh  (born 5 November 1945) is a Cambodian politician who is the current Deputy Prime Minister and Minister for National Defence of Cambodia. He is a former general and a member of the Cambodian People's Party and was elected to represent Siem Reap Province in the National Assembly of Cambodia in the 2003 elections.

Personal life
Banh, whose birth name was "Tea Sangvan" later changed to Thai name, Sangvan Hin-kling and "Tea Banh" in last, is of Sino-Thai descent. His father, a Thai-Chinese, was named Tea Toek and his mother Nou Peng Chenda, was an ethnic Thai. Banh married Tao Toeun, who is also an ethnic Thai, in 1975. They have three children, including Tea Seiha (also spelt Tea Seyha), the governor of Siem Reap province. Banh's brother Tea Vinh is the commander of the Royal Cambodian Navy.

Honours
:
 Collar of the Grand Order of National Merit
 Grand Cross of the Royal Order of Cambodia
 Grand Cross of the Royal Order of Sowathara
 Grand Officer of the Royal Order of H.M. The Queen Preah Kossomak Nearirath
 Recipient of the Sena Jayaseddh Medal
 Recipient of the Medal of National Defense in gold, two stars
 Recipient of the Medal of National Defense in silver, two stars
 Recipient of the Medal of National Defense in bronze, two stars
 Recipient of the Medal of Labour
 Recipient of the Decoration of National Construction (Twice)
: 
  Knight Grand Cross of the Order of the White Elephant

References

1945 births
Cambodian People's Party politicians
Cambodian politicians of Chinese descent
Cambodian people of Thai descent
Tea Banh
Cambodian generals
Cambodian military personnel
Deputy Prime Ministers of Cambodia
Knights Grand Cross of the Royal Order of Cambodia
Government ministers of Cambodia
Defence ministers of Cambodia
Living people
People from Koh Kong province
Members of the National Assembly (Cambodia)